Windon is a surname. Notable people with the surname include:

 Colin Windon (1921–2003), Australian rugby union player
 Keith Windon (1917–1998), Australian rugby union player
 Stephen F. Windon (born 1959), Australian cinematographer

See also
 Winton (surname)